Šentjošt is a settlement in the hills southeast of Novo Mesto in southeastern Slovenia. The area is part of the traditional region of Lower Carniola and is now included in the Southeast Slovenia Statistical Region.

The local church, from which the settlement also gets its name, is dedicated to Saint Judoc and belongs to the Parish of Stopiče. It is a 16th-century building that was extensively restyled in the early 19th century.

References

External links
Šentjošt on Geopedia

Populated places in the City Municipality of Novo Mesto